Luke Goddard (born 17 April 1988) is an English professional golfer.

Goddard was born in London. He had a successful amateur career, winning the 2008 Argentine Amateur Open Championship and the 2009 English Amateur, and representing Great Britain and Ireland in the 2009 Walker Cup. He turned professional in October 2009.

Amateur wins
2006 Peter McEvoy Trophy
2008 Campeonato Argentino de Aficionados (Argentine Amateur Championship)
2009 English Amateur

Professional wins (1)

PGA EuroPro Tour wins (1)

Team appearances
Amateur
European Boys' Team Championship (representing England): 2006
Jacques Léglise Trophy (representing Great Britain & Ireland): 2006
Eisenhower Trophy (representing England): 2008
Walker Cup (representing Great Britain & Ireland): 2009
European Amateur Team Championship (representing England): 2009

References

External links

English male golfers
European Tour golfers
1988 births
Living people